The National Day of Remembrance of the victims of the Genocide of Citizens of the Polish Republic committed by Ukrainian Nationalists (Polish: Narodowy Dzień Pamięci Ofiar Ludobójstwa dokonanego przez ukraińskich nacjonalistów na obywatelach II Rzeczypospolitej Polskiej) is an official commemorative date in Poland, celebrated on July 11. It is not a day off. The day of July 11 was chosen because it was July 11, 1943, that became the apogee of the Massacres of Poles in Volhynia and Eastern Galicia when armed units of Ukrainian nationalists simultaneously attacked 99 settlements inhabited by ethnic Poles.

History of establishment
On July 15, 2009, the Sejm of Poland in its resolution (adopted by unanimous acclamation without voting procedure) stated that the Organization of Ukrainian Nationalists (OUN) and Ukrainian Insurgent Army (UPA) carried out "an anti-Polish action — mass killings that had the character of ethnic cleansing and had signs of genocide", in addition, in the resolution the Sejm "honors the memory of the Home Army soldiers, Self-Defense of the Eastern Kres and Peasant battalions who rose to the dramatic struggle to protect the Polish civilian population and also remembers with pain the victims among the Ukrainian civilian population".

On July 15, 2013, the Sejm adopted a special resolution dedicated to the 70th anniversary of the "Volyn Crime" (this name is used in the resolution), which notes that the crimes committed by the OUN and UPA had an "organized and massive scale", which gave them "the character of ethnic cleansing with signs of genocide."

On July 7, 2016, the upper house of the Parliament of Poland, the Senate, adopted a resolution "on the issue of perpetuating the memory of the victims of the genocide committed by Ukrainian nationalists against citizens of the Second Polish Republic in 1939-1945." 

On July 22, 2016, the Sejm of the Republic of Poland established this memorial day in memory of the victims of the Volyn massacre of the Polish population, organized by the fighters of the OUN, UPA, SS Galicia division and other Ukrainian formations during World War II. Deputies from the Polish Peasant Party proposed another name — "The Day of Remembrance of the Poles-victims of the genocide committed by the OUN-UPA on the Eastern Borders of the Second Polish Republic".

Reaction in Ukraine  
President of Ukraine Petro Poroshenko in his Facebook account expressed the opinion that he "regrets the decision of the Polish Sejm. I know that many will want to use it for political speculation. However, we should turn to the testament of John Paul II — we forgive and ask for forgiveness." The Verkhovna Rada Committee on Foreign Affairs of Ukraine issued a special statement in which it expressed "deep concern" about the resolution of Sejm. The all-Ukrainian association Svoboda condemned the decision of the Polish Sejm.

References

Massacres of Poles in Volhynia
Public holidays in Poland